Rutkay Aziz (born 16 May 1947) is a Turkish actor. He has appeared in more than twenty films since 1987.

Selected filmography

References

External links 

1947 births
Living people
Turkish male film actors
Male actors from Istanbul